Quintus Tineius Sacerdos (c. 160 – aft. 219) was a Roman senator. He is attested as Consul Suffectus 16 March 193 with Publius Julius Scapula Priscus. 

As a youth he was a member of the college of the Salii Palatini. Offices he held as an adult included Governor of Bithynia et Pontus, and Proconsul of Asia sometime between 200 and 210. The apex of his career was serving as Consul Ordinarius in 219 with Emperor Elagabalus.

Sacerdos was the son of Quintus Tineius Sacerdos Clemens. His brothers were Quintus Tineius Rufus and Quintus Tineius Clemens.

Family tree

References

Imperial Roman consuls
Roman governors of Bithynia and Pontus
Roman governors of Asia
2nd-century Romans
3rd-century Romans
160 births
3rd-century deaths
Year of birth uncertain
Year of death unknown
Sacerdos, Quintus